is a professional Japanese baseball player.

References 

1970 births
Chiba Lotte Marines players
Chunichi Dragons players
Japanese expatriate baseball players in the United States
Living people
Lotte Orions players
Nippon Professional Baseball pitchers
Oklahoma RedHawks players
Baseball people from Fukuoka Prefecture
Yomiuri Giants players